"Without You" is the debut single from freestyle singer George Lamond's debut album Bad of the Heart. The song was released on August 14, 1989, by Columbia Records. It was written by Philip Andreula and produced by Mark Liggett and Chris Barbosa.

Track listing
US 12" single

Charts

References

1989 debut singles
George Lamond songs
Song recordings produced by Chris Barbosa
1989 songs
Columbia Records singles